James Emery White (born December 20, 1961), is the founding and senior pastor of Mecklenburg Community Church in Charlotte, North Carolina; President of Serious Times, a ministry that explores the intersection of faith and culture and hosts ChurchandCulture.org; ranked adjunctive professor of theology and culture on the Charlotte campus of Gordon-Conwell Theological Seminary where he also served as their fourth president; and author of more than 20 books that have been translated into ten languages.

Mecklenburg Community Church began with a single family and has grown to more than 10,000 active attenders. The church experiences more than 70% of its growth from those who were previously unchurched and during its formative years was often cited as one of the fastest growing church starts in the United States. He is also Distinguished Professor of Pastoral Ministry at Anderson University, and consulting editor to Leadership Journal.

White holds a B.S. degree in public relations and business from Appalachian State University and the M.Div. and Ph.D. degrees from the Southern Baptist Theological Seminary, where he received a Garrett Teaching Fellowship in both New testament and Theology. He has also done advanced university study at Vanderbilt University in American religious history and continuing education at Oxford University in England, including participation in Oxford's Summer Programme in Theology.
  
White is the author of more than 20 books, including such Gold Medallion nominees as Serious Times and A Search for the Spiritual, Christianity Today book-of-the-year award winner Embracing the Mysterious God, as well as The Prayer God Longs For and Rethinking the Church. His most recent publications include Christianity for People Who Aren't Christians, Meet Generation Z, The Rise of the Nones, The Church in an Age of Crisis, and What They Didn't Teach You in Seminary.

In November 2009, White signed an ecumenical statement known as the Manhattan Declaration calling on evangelicals, Catholics and Orthodox not to comply with rules and laws permitting abortion, same-sex marriage and other matters that go against their religious consciences.

Works

Books

External links
 http://www.mecklenburg.org/
 http://www.churchandculture.org/

References

1961 births
American Baptist theologians
Appalachian State University alumni
Living people
Southern Baptist Theological Seminary alumni
Seminary presidents